Al-Malik al-Ẓāhir Sayf al-Dīn Abū Saʿīd Khushqadam ibn ʿAbdallāh al-Nāṣirī l-Muʾayyadī (– 9 October 1467) was
a Mamluk sultan of Egypt and Syria from 28 June 1461 to 9 October 1467. He was born in Cairo, Egypt

Family
One of Khushqadam's wives was Khawand Shukurbay. She was a Circassian, and had been a manumitted slave of Sultan An-Nasir Faraj. She had been married to Amir Abruk al-Jakami, with whom she had a daughter, Baykhun (died 31 July 1462). After Arbuk's death, she married Khushqadam. Her daughter became known as the Sultan's step-daughter. She was buried in Khushqadam's tomb, and her son Shihab al-Din Ahmad al-Ayni (died 1503) was raised by Khushqadam after his father's death. Shukurbay was said to have been exceptionally strong willed. After her death in 1466, Khushqadam married Khawand Surbay, one of several concubines acquired by him, and with whom he had a daughter.

References

Sources
 

15th-century Mamluk sultans
Year of birth uncertain
1400s births
1467 deaths
Egyptian people of Albanian descent